Mapracorat (INN, code names BOL-303242-X, ZK-245186) is an anti-inflammatory drug belonging to the experimental class of selective glucocorticoid receptor agonists (SEGRAs). It is in clinical trials for the topical treatment of atopic dermatitis, inflammation following cataract surgery, and allergic conjunctivitis. Preliminary investigation for the treatment of keratoconjunctivitis sicca has been conducted in cellular models.

Clinical trials
Phase II clinical trials with mapracorat started in summer 2009. One trial was a double blind dose finding study for an ointment against atopic dermatitis. It tested concentrations of 0.01%, 0.03% and 0.1% versus placebo over four weeks in around 64 patients. This trial was conducted by Intendis, a part of Bayer HealthCare Pharmaceuticals specialized on dermatology, and completed in September or October 2010. The other trial, also with a double blind design, evaluated an ophthalmic suspension for the treatment of inflammation following cataract surgery. Various concentrations and dosing schemes were tested versus placebo in about 550 patients. The study was conducted by Bausch & Lomb and completed in September 2010. Its successor study, a phase III trial, started in November 2010 and completed in August 2011.

 no study results are available.

See also 
 AZD-5423
 Dagrocorat
 Fosdagrocorat

References 

Anti-inflammatory agents
Benzofurans
Fluoroarenes
Immunosuppressants
Quinolines
Selective glucocorticoid receptor modulators
Trifluoromethyl compounds